KDSO-LD (channel 16), branded on-air as theDove TV, is a low-power religious television station in Medford, Oregon, United States. KDOV-LD (channel 18) serves as a translator of KDSO. The stations are owned by theDove Media alongside KDOV (91.7 FM) in Medford, KDRC-LD (channel 26) in Redding, California, and another low-powered station in Yuba City, which operates a network of low-power translators throughout Northern California and airs theDove TV on the primary channel of most of these translators.

Programming
KDSO-LD/KDOV-LD broadcasts a schedule of local and national Christian programs, including those from Christian Broadcasting Network, which produces news and informational programming, including CBN NewsWatch, Christian World News, The 700 Club (which also aired daily on fellow Medford station CBS affiliate KTVL (channel 10) until September 2012 when it moved over to Fox affiliate KMVU (channel 26)) and 700 Club Interactive. Local programming featured includes Mornings on theDove and Focus Today (both simulcasts with KDOV radio) and news updates throughout the day.

They have also broadcast programs from LeSEA Broadcasting in the past.

Programming seen on theDove TV
 theDove TV Programming Schedule – featuring local and syndicated programming

On-air talent
 Perry Atkinson - Host, Mornings on theDove, Focus Today, Afternoons on theDove (President / CEO - theDove Media, Inc.)
 Polina Leiser - Co-Host / Executive Producer, Mornings on theDove
 Steve Johnson - TV Operations Manager / News Director / Co-Host, Mornings on theDove
 Jerry Bilden - Occasional Fill-In (KDOV 91.7 FM Music Director)
 Ashley Carrasco - Anchor/Reporter, News Update / News Anchor (formerly of KTVL)

Former notables
 Demi DeSoto - Anchor/Reporter, News Update / News Anchor (formerly of KTVL)
 Jim McCoy - Sports Director / Play-By-Play Commentator for Cascade Christian High School football and boys basketball (KDOV 91.7 FM)

Subchannels

Translators

Board of directors
 Perry Atkinson, President
 Dallas Rhoden, Vice President
 Jason Atkinson, Secretary / Treasurer
 Hal Short, Chairman of the Board
 Mark Portrait, Director
 Ted Darnell, Director

Awards
In 2011, theDove TV was the recipient of the National Religious Broadcasters' prestigious Low Power Television Station of the Year.

In 2022, theDove TV received another NRB Low Power Television Station of the Year.

YouTube banishment
On March 22, 2021, theDove TV was removed from and banned permanently by YouTube.  This was as result of claims that theDove was repeatedly violating their "COVID-19 misinformation and presidential election integrity policies" that were added to its "community standards" around the time of the 2020 United States presidential election.

A spokesperson for YouTube stated, "Any channel that violates these policies will receive a strike, which temporarily restricts uploading or live-streaming. Channels that receive three strikes in the same 90-day period will be permanently removed from YouTube. If a channel owner feels the strike was made in error, they can appeal the decision."  The appeal was made, but denied by YouTube.  A claim of ownership to the videos was also made, but it, too, was denied.

theDove posted this response on the home page of their website: "On March 22, 2021 theDove's First Amendment Rights were attacked as theDove was permanently banned from YouTube.  The only reason given to us was that our content violated their 'Community Standards'.

"This removal included over 15,000 videos of our guests and news broadcasts... they are now permanently gone.

"theDove has over 40 years of providing hope, encouragement and giving a Biblical perspective to current events.  Despite these attacks on our free speech, theDove will not be silenced.  We are finalizing plans to switch to a new digital video streaming platform, and now we need your help!  The new service will cost approximately $60,000 per year.  Please pray about partnering with theDove financially and helping us distribute our content and provide hope and encouragement to people all over the world."  

At press time, theDove Media, LLC, owners of theDove Network, has legal counsel representing them and is taking legal action against YouTube for violating free speech rights and refusing to return their videos.

See also
 Christian Broadcasting Network
 National Religious Broadcasters
 United Christian Broadcasters

References

External links
 theDove official website
 
 

DSO-LD
Religious television stations in the United States
Television channels and stations established in 2008
2008 establishments in Oregon